Poosapatirega is a village in Vizianagaram district of the Indian state of Andhra Pradesh, India.

Demography
Poosapatirega mandal has a population of 68,839 in 2001. Males constitutes 35,200 and females 33,639 of the population. The average literacy rate is 39%, very low when compared to the national average of 59.5%. Male literacy rate is 47% and female literacy rate 30%.

List of Villages in Pusapatirega Mandal

Notable Personalities
Ashish Kumar Kolachina - Software Engineer (Dubai).

References 

Villages in Vizianagaram district
Mandal headquarters in Vizianagaram district